Inosine triphosphate pyrophosphatase is an enzyme that in humans is encoded by the ITPA gene, by the rdgB gene in bacteria E.coli and the HAM1 gene in yeast S. cerevisiae; the protein is also encoded by some RNA viruses of the Potyviridae family. Two transcript variants encoding two different isoforms have been found for this gene. Also, at least two other transcript variants have been identified which are probably regulatory rather than protein-coding.

Function 

The protein encoded by this gene hydrolyzes inosine triphosphate and deoxyinosine triphosphate to the monophosphate nucleotide and diphosphate. The enzyme possesses a multiple substrate-specificity and acts on other nucleotides including xanthosine triphosphate and deoxyxanthosine triphosphate. The encoded protein, which is a member of the HAM1 NTPase protein family, is found in the cytoplasm and acts as a homodimer.

Clinical significance 

Defects in the encoded protein can result in inosine triphosphate pyrophosphorylase deficiency. The enzyme ITPase dephosphorylates ribavirin triphosphate in vitro to ribavirin monophosphate, and ITPase reduced enzymatic activity present in 30 % of humans potentiates mutagenesis in hepatitis C virus. Gene variants predicting reduced predicted ITPase activity have been associated with decreased risk of ribavirin-induced anemia, increased risk of thrombocytopenia, lower ribavirin concentrations, as well as a ribavirin-like reduced relapse risk following interferon-based therapy for hepatitis C virus (HCV) genotype 2 or 3 infection.

Reading

References